Hans R. Wüthrich is a Swiss-Canadian top curling ice technician.

Born in Brügglen, Switzerland, Wüthrich emigrated to Canada in 1976, when he was 19.

He has been making ice since 1993 for major events around the world such as the Brier and World Curling Championships. Wüthrich was the recipient of the 2003 Canadian Curling Association's 'Award of Achievement' for his significant contributions in the development of new pebble heads and ice scraper technology. He lives in Gimli, Manitoba.

On June 11, 2007, the World Curling Federation announced that Wüthrich was appointed as the technician in charge of the curling sheets at the 2010 Winter Olympics in Vancouver, British Columbia, Canada. Dave Merklinger, of New Westminster, was his assistant.

Wüthrich also was the technician in charge of the ice at the 2014 Winter Olympics in Sochi, Russia. He was the Chief Ice Technician at the 2018 Winter Olympics and the 2022 Winter Olympics.

References

External links
 Hans Wuthrich's curling ice consulting company
 Olympic icemakers named, CBC British Columbia, June 18, 2007.
 Branch, John. "Curlers Are Finicky When It Comes to Their Olympic Ice," The New York Times, Monday, August 17, 2009.

People from Gimli, Manitoba
Sportspeople from Manitoba
Swiss emigrants to Canada
Curling ice makers
1950s births
Living people
Year of birth uncertain